is a song by Japanese rock band Asian Kung-Fu Generation. It was released as the second single of their major-label debut album, Kimi Tsunagi Five M, on October 16, 2003. The song's b-side, "Rocket No.4," was later included on the band's 2006 anniversary compilation, Feedback File. "Kimi to Iu Hana" was ranked at 3rd on fans request for band's 10th anniversary live setlist on September 14, 2013.

Music video
The music video for "Kimi to Iu Hana" was directed by Toshiaki Toyoda. A majority of the PV was filmed near a lake and an apartment complex. The video begins with a small man dressed in an elf costume dancing to the song while walking across a pier. AKG is then shown performing between the apartments and the lake. This is intercut with various scenes which depict the band running, angling, and finally joining the man in dancing across the pier. The video ends with an image of a flower dangling on a fishing hook. In 2004, the video won the award for Best New Artist Video at the SPACE SHOWER Music Video Awards.

Track listing

Cover versions

 Marié Digby - Second Home (2009)
 KANA-BOON - AKG TRIBUTE (2017)

Personnel
Masafumi Gotō – lead vocals
Kensuke Kita – lead guitar, background vocals
Takahiro Yamada –  bass, background vocals
Kiyoshi Ijichi – drums
Asian Kung-Fu Generation – producer
Yusuke Nakamura – single cover art

Charts

References

Asian Kung-Fu Generation songs
2003 singles
Songs written by Masafumi Gotoh
2003 songs
Ki/oon Music singles